Marc Charles Kushner (born September 27, 1977) is an American architect, entrepreneur and author. He was a partner at the New York City based architecture firm Hollwich Kushner and co-founded Architizer.

Early life and education 
The son of Lee Kushner and real estate developer Murray Kushner, Marc Kushner was raised Modern Orthodox Jewish in Livingston, New Jersey. Kushner graduated from The Frisch School before attending the University of Pennsylvania where he received a Bachelor of Arts, majoring in Political Science and Contemporary Vernacular Architecture as Cultural Artifact. Kushner then attended Harvard Graduate School of Design and received a Master of Architecture.

Business career

Architecture 
After working for multiple architecture firms including Steven Holl, Jürgen Mayer H. and Lewis Tsurumaki Lewis, Kushner formed the architecture firm Hollwich Kushner in 2007 with Matthias Hollwich whom he had met in Jürgen Mayer's Berlin kitchen five years prior. In 2012 Marc Kushner and Matthias Hollwich won MoMA PS1's Young Architects Program with their project Wendy. Following the success of Wendy, Hollwich and Kushner received multiple commissions including the Fire Island Pines Pavilion (2013), the University of Pennsylvania’s LEED Gold Pennovation Center (2016), Journal Squared (2017), and the speculative innovation campus 25 Kent (2018). In 2017, the firm was included in Fast Company's  ranking of the World's Most Innovative companies.  Marc has spoken on the state of architecture at events such as TED and PSFK. In 2019 Marc Kushner left Hollwich Kushner.

Architizer
During the financial crisis of 2007–2008, Marc Kushner and his business partner Matthias Hollwich created  a digital platform to help architects promote their firms’ work. Architizer rapidly grew to become the largest platform for architecture online. To increase visibility of global architecture Kushner incepted the A+ Awards in 2013. They have grown to become the largest global architecture awards program.

The Future of Architecture in 100 Buildings 
In 2014 Kushner was invited to speak at the 30th anniversary of TED in Vancouver. There he reviewed the last 30 years of architectural history and expounded on how social media was changing the direction of the way buildings are designed.  The TED talk was followed in 2015 with Marc Kushner's first book, published by Simon & Schuster and TED Books - The Future of Architecture in 100 Buildings.

Personal life 
Kushner married Christopher Barley, also an architect, in a Jewish ceremony on March 31, 2012. He is openly gay.

Kushner's brother Jonathan Kushner is a real estate developer and president of their family's real estate organization, Kushner Real Estate Group. Marc is a first cousin of former presidential advisor Jared Kushner (son-in-law of Donald Trump), and Joshua Kushner, managing partner of Thrive Capital, a New York-based private equity firm. 

Kushner also serves as president of the Board of Friends of Plus Pool, a nonprofit behind the development of a water-filtering, floating swimming pool that will filter and clean urban rivers.

See also
Kushner family

References

External links
 

21st-century American architects
Living people
1977 births
Jewish architects
Harvard Graduate School of Design alumni
Marc
University of Pennsylvania alumni
LGBT people from New York (state)
LGBT architects
LGBT Jews
People from Livingston, New Jersey
LGBT people from New Jersey
American people of Belarusian-Jewish descent
American chief executives